Big John, Little John is an American Saturday-morning situation comedy, produced by Sherwood Schwartz, which starred Herbert Edelman as "Big John" and Robert "Robbie" Rist as "Little John."  The show first aired on September 11, 1976, on NBC, and ran for one season of 13 episodes. The series was produced by Redwood Productions in association with D'Angelo-Bullock-Allen Productions.  In the United Kingdom, it was shown on BBC1.

Plot summary

The show's main character was a forty-year-old middle school science teacher named John Martin (played by Edelman). While vacationing in Florida, he drinks from a spring which turns out to be the legendary Fountain of Youth sought by Juan Ponce de León. The water changes him into a twelve-year-old boy (played by Rist), and back again.

The changes occur spontaneously and without warning. Because Martin only sipped the water, the changes are recurring and not permanent; according to legend, had he taken a full drink, he would be age twelve permanently. Only his wife, Marjorie (Joyce Bulifant), and son, Ricky (Mike Darnell), know his secret, though Martin's students (who befriend him as "Little John") and his boss, principal Bertha Bottomly (Olive Dunbar), do become suspicious that something unusual is going on. The Martin family explain the younger John as their nephew, staying with them. Throughout the series, "Big John" unsuccessfully tries to find a cure for his predicament, but his experiences as "Little John" often give him insight into what his students are facing.

To make the two actors resemble each other more closely, Rist's blond hair was dyed brown, while Edelman wore a hairpiece that partially covered his baldness, though was absent during the credits sequences. Edelman and Rist appeared together in 1977, on the Jerry Lewis MDA Telethon.

Cast
Herb Edelman - Big John Martin
Robbie Rist - Little John Martin
Joyce Bulifant - Marjorie Martin
Mike Darnell - Ricky Martin
Olive Dunbar - Bertha Bottomly
Kristoff St. John - Homer
Cari Anne Warder - Valerie
Stephen H. Cassidy - Stanley

Rist had previously worked on Schwartz's The Brady Bunch during its final season (1973–1974), as the Bradys' cousin, Oliver.

Episodes

Home media
The complete series was released on DVD (for Regions 1 and 2) in 2009 by Fabulous Films.

References

External links
 
Big John, Little John at 70s Live Action Kid Vid website

1976 American television series debuts
1976 American television series endings
1970s American children's television series
1970s American sitcoms
American children's television sitcoms
American fantasy television series
English-language television shows
NBC original programming
Television series by CBS Studios
Television series about children
Television series about size change
Television series created by Sherwood Schwartz